George Lowther Steer (22 November 1909 – 25 December 1944) was a South African-born British journalist, author and war correspondent who reported on wars preceding World War II, especially the Second Italo-Abyssinian War and the Spanish Civil War. During those wars he was employed by The Times, and his eye-witness reports did much to alert western nations of war crimes committed by the Italians in Ethiopia and by the Germans in Spain, although little was done to prevent them by the League of Nations. He returned to Ethiopia after the world war started and helped the campaign defeat the Italians and restore Hailie Selassie to the throne.

Early life
George Steer was born in South Africa in 1909, the son of a newspaper manager. He studied classics in England, at Winchester College and Christ Church, Oxford. He began his journalistic career in South Africa, then worked in London for the Yorkshire Post.

War correspondent

In 1935 Steer covered the Italian invasion of Ethiopia, also known as the Second Italo-Ethiopian War, for The Times. He reported that Italian forces made extensive use of poison gas in the form of mustard gas and also bombed Red Cross ambulances, despite clear markings of the red cross. He was involved in helping to transport gas masks to Ethiopia to give at least some protection against the poison gases deployed illegally by the Italians.  He became friendly with Emperor Haile Selassie I of Ethiopia, who later became godfather to Steer's son. He met and married his first wife in Ethiopia, under difficult conditions in the British Legation in Addis Ababa, with looting and rifle fire outside the gates of the compound. His wife and his first child died in childbirth in London a little later.

Spanish civil war

In 1937 he was sent to report on the Spanish Civil War. His first reports from the Basque country described how British merchant ships beat the Nationalist blockade of Bilbao to bring food to the starving people of the town and surrounding region. He also visited the front line on several occasions to report directly on the fighting.

He won prominence with his scoop report on the bombing of Guernica on 26 April 1937. His telegram to London described German bomb casings (inscribed with the words Rheindorf 1936, with the German eagle insignia), and the use of thermite as an incendiary to create a firestorm in the center of the town. High explosive bombs were used to create blast damage to wooden structures, which could then be ignited more easily by the incendiaries.  His reporting did much to inspire Pablo Picasso to record the atrocity for posterity in his massive painting. It also alerted western governments to the way the Germans were preparing to use terror bombing as a way to intimidate civilians. His reports were directly contradicted by the Nationalists, who said that the damage was caused by the Republican forces themselves, as they had at Ita earlier in the conflict, although a League of Nations investigation concluded that neither the terror bombing theory nor the Nationalist's version of intentional arson were accurate. Steer responded to such reports by providing details of the damage in the town (such as bomb craters) and the Luftwaffe aircraft used in the attack, such as Heinkel He 111 bombers. Although he was not an eye-witness to the bombing itself, he arrived soon afterwards, and so was able to see the effects and talk to some of the survivors. He was one of the last journalists to leave Bilbao as the Nationalists advanced, and fled to Santander to the west.

Winter war in Finland
The anti-Fascist tone of Steer's reporting led The Times to dispense with his services; the newspaper's editorial stance on the war was anti-Republican, whilst its editor, Geoffrey Dawson, privately sympathised with the Nationalists under Francisco Franco. However the newspaper had a general policy of appeasement when it came to Germany, the Nazis and Fascism. 
Steer returned to South Africa and, in his book Judgment on German Africa, documented Germany's attempts to subvert its former African colonies, especially the Cameroon, South West Africa (now known as Namibia), Tanganyika and Togoland.

After the outbreak of World War II, the Daily Telegraph dispatched Steer to Finland to cover the Winter War, when Finland was attacked by the Soviet Union in November 1939. Steer saw the effects of aerial bombing of several Finnish towns by the Soviets, attempts made to intimidate the population, just like at Guernica. But by contrast with Ethiopia and Spain, western countries such as Britain and France (and nazi Germany) were only too eager to offer arms and equipment as well as volunteers to assist the Finns. The war was of relatively short duration owing to the disparity in armed might, although the Russian casualties were much greater than those of the Finns. An armistice was signed in March, 1940 and Finland lost about 10% of her territory to the Soviets.

Return to Ethiopia
When Italy declared war on Britain, plans were laid to invade Ethiopia from Kenya and the Sudan, with the aim of toppling the Italian regime and re-instating Hailie Selassie as Emperor. Steer was appointed as an officer in the Intelligence Corps of the British Army, initially to chaperone Selassie from London to the Sudan (under the pseudonym, "Mr Smith" since the position of the Emperor had to be kept secret from the Italians). He was then put in charge of a mobile propaganda unit to undermine the Italian garrisons by leafletting, loudspeaker attacks and so on. The campaign was remarkably successful, with many Italian troops deserting to become prisoners, and Ethiopians transferring allegiance. Steer broadcast light Italian operas and news from the Italian front in Libya, where the British army had great successes against much larger Italian forces in 1941. The military campaign waged by British and Ethiopian soldiers was very successful, using a combination of regular troops and irregular forces led by Orde Wingate. They entered Addis Ababa in triumph in April 1941 to accept the defeat of the Italians.

Personal life
In May 1936, as looters ravaged Addis Ababa around him, and while taking a break from rescue work, Steer married French newspaper correspondent Margarita Herrero. A short while afterwards he was deported by the Italian authorities, along with other Europeans, for aiding the opposition Abyssinians.

Margarita Steer died in childbirth in London while George Steer was reporting on the Spanish Civil War.  He later married Esme Barton.

In 2006 the town of Guernica honored George Steer unveiling a bronze bust and naming a street in his memory. Also in 2010 the City of Bilbao (Biscay) dedicated George Steer Street, with Steer's son and granddaughter attending the ceremony.

Military service and death

In June 1940 Steer joined the British Army and led an Ethiopian Forward Propaganda unit when British troops began to fight Italian troops in the country. After the defeat of the Italians in Ethiopia in 1941, Steer was influential in restoring Haile Selassie to the throne. Later Steer was sent to India to lead a Field Propaganda Unit in Burma. The unit tried to break Japanese morale by loudspeakers with speeches and sentimental music. He was successively promoted from Lieutenant to Captain, Major and finally, Lieutenant-colonel, and was attached to the Special Operations Executive. His work was appreciated and promoted by General Slim, the local army commander, who wanted to expand the operation.

George Steer died in the crash of a heavily loaded Army Jeep, which he was driving, in Burma on 25 December 1944 on the way to a Christmas party.

References

Books by Steer

 Caesar in Abyssinia: An account of the Italo-Abyssinian war, 1935-6. With a map (1936). 
 The Tree of Gernika: A field study of modern war. With plates and maps (1938).  
 Germany in Africa. A series of articles dealing with the question of the former German African Colonies (1938).
 A Date in the Desert (1939).
 Judgment on German Africa (1939).
 Abyssinia to-day with W. Arnold-Forster (1939).
 Sealed and delivered : a book on the Abyssinian Campaign (1942).

Books about Steer

 Nicholas Rankin – Telegram from Guernica: The Extraordinary Life of George Steer, War Correspondent , 2003, Faber and Faber

1909 births
1944 deaths
British male journalists
English anti-fascists
People educated at Winchester College
Road incident deaths in India
British Army personnel killed in World War II
Special Operations Executive personnel
Alumni of Christ Church, Oxford
War correspondents of the Spanish Civil War
The Times journalists
Accidental deaths in Myanmar
The Daily Telegraph people
South African emigrants to the United Kingdom